"Back in the Night" is a song by the band Dr. Feelgood. Recorded in 1975, it appeared on their second album, Malpractice.

"Back in the Night" was also issued as a single in the UK in July 1975. It failed to reach the UK Singles Chart.  Written by Wilko Johnson, and produced by Vic Maile, the song was Dr. Feelgood's third single release. The b-side of the record, was a live recording of a cover version of "I'm a Man", penned by Bo Diddley.
 
"Back in the Night" was also later included in Dr. Feelgood's 1997's compilation album, Twenty Five Years of Dr. Feelgood.

References

1975 singles
Music in Southend-on-Sea
Dr. Feelgood (band) songs
Song recordings produced by Vic Maile
1975 songs
United Artists Records singles
Songs written by Wilko Johnson